Martin Plowman (born 3 October 1987) is a British professional racing driver from Tamworth currently competing in the British GT Championship for Paddock Motorsport, which he co-founded with Kelvin Fletcher. In 2013, he won the 24 Hours of Le Mans in the LMP2 class and was 2013 FIA WEC World Champion in the LMP2 class for drivers and teams.

Racing career

Early career
After several extremely successful years in karting, Toyota signed Plowman to a 10-year contract to their young driver program. He made his professional debut in 2006 driving in Italian Formula Renault for Prema Powerteam, finishing 5th in the Italian Series, claiming rookie of the year.

He returned to the same team and series in 2007, finishing joint 7th with Team-Mate Henkie Waldscmidt in Italian Formula Renault. A disappointing end to the campaign for the Prema Powerteam after holding 1–2 in the championship halfway through the season. Plowman was dropped from the Toyota young driver program at the end of 2007.

In 2008 Plowman became an official Volkswagen junior driver where he was assigned to the newly re-formed RC Motorsport team and drove in the first seven rounds (14 races) of the Formula Three Euroseries where he failed to score any points and only managed a best finish of 17th. He also drove in the Masters of Formula 3 with Signature-Plus where he finished 14th.

Indy Lights
In 2009 Plowman signed to drive for Panther Racing in the American Firestone Indy Lights series, the feeder series to IndyCars. Martin finished 11th in the points standings in his inaugural season with Panther Racing, while achieving two top five finishes and eight top ten finishes.

After the 2009 season, Martin signed on board with AFS-Andretti Autosport to compete with teammate Charlie Kimball in the 2010 Indy Lights season. Plowman won from the pole to capture his first victory at the Mid-Ohio Sports Car Course. He captured another pole two races later at Chicagoland Speedway but was knocked after making contact with former teammate Pippa Mann while leading the race. He finished third in the championship, one spot ahead of Kimball.

IndyCar Series
In 2011 Plowman made his IndyCar Series debut with Sam Schmidt Motorsports as a part of their partnership with AFS Racing. Plowman competed in the events at Mid-Ohio Sports Car Course, Infineon Raceway, and the Baltimore Grand Prix, driving the number 17 car featuring the logo of Snowball Express, a volunteer organisation created to assist the children of military personnel who have died while on active duty since the 9/11 attacks.
 In each event, Plowman improved upon his starting position and upon his previous results, culminating in a near top-10 finish at the Baltimore Grand Prix. In the off-season, he has continued his involvement with Snowball Express, speaking to military families and touring with a show car.

American LeMans Series
On 24 February 2012, the Conquest Endurance racing team announced Plowman, David Heinemeier Hansson, and Francesco Dracone as co-drivers for the team's brand new entry in the LMP2 division of the American LeMans Series for the 2012 season. The number 37 Judd-powered, Morgan-badged car debuted at the 60th Anniversary running of the 12 Hours of Sebring on 17 March 2012. The team finished 3rd in the ALMS P2 class (44th overall), despite having to replace Dracone with Jan Heylen just 12 hours before the race due to illness. On 10 April 2012, the team announced a partnership with Nissan North America to supply engines for the No. 37 car for the remainder of the season, beginning at the Toyota Grand Prix of Long Beach. Plowman and Heinemeier Hansson achieved their first P2 class pole and victory (3rd place overall) at the Grand Prix of Mosport on 22 July 2012. This was also the first victory for the Conquest Endurance team in ALMS competition.

FIA World Endurance Championship
After the 2012 season, Conquest Endurance ended its participation in the ALMS.

 2013 season

For 2013, Plowman and his Conquest co-driver Heinemeier Hansson were both hired by OAK Racing to drive Morgan-Nissans in the LMP2 class on the FIA World Endurance Championship. Plowman shares the number 35 entry with co-drivers Bertrand Baguette and Ricardo González.

The 2013 season started at the 6 Hours of Silverstone, the OAK Racing Morgan LMP2-Nissan No. 35 finished in fourth place (twelfth overall), to get their first 10 points for the World Championship.

On the 6 Hours of Spa-Francorchamps, González, Baguette and Plowman finished in third position (for cars registered for points in the FIA World Endurance Championship), of LMP2 class (eleventh overall).

In 2013 Plowman and his co-drivers Ricardo González and Bertrand Baguette from OAK Racing Morgan LMP2-Nissan team, won the 81st edition of the 24 Hours of Le Mans in LMP2 class (seventh overall). Their Morgan LMP2 covered a total of 329 laps in the Circuit de la Sarthe. The race was run in very difficult weather conditions and several serious accidents bringing out a record of twelve safety car caution periods.

The 6 Hours of São Paulo were held at the Autódromo José Carlos Pace, on 30 August – 1 September. González, Baguette and Plowman got the second place of LMP2 category, only behind Oreca 03-Nissan team (Rusinov, Martin and Conway). With this result the British driver got his second podium of the year.

In the fifth round of 2013 season were the 6 Hours of Circuit of the Americas in Austin, Texas on 20–22 September. González, Baguette and Plowman obtained the seventh place of LMP2 category (eleventh overall).

On 18–20 October, in the 6 hours of Fuji, following a two-hour delay the race was restarted once more under the safety car, lapping another eight circuits before officials stopped the race again and eventually called an end to the event. The No. 35 OAK Morgan-Nissan (Baguette, González and Plowman), started in the pole position and was declared the race winner of LMP2 class (fourth overall), in the same position they started. Due to difficult weather conditions half points will be awarded for all the teams and drivers in the event.

During the 6 Hours of Shanghai on 8–9 November, the No. 35 OAK Morgan-Nissan trio (Baguette, González and Plowman), qualified in fourth position and finished in third place (7th overall). With this new podium the French team extend their lead on 15 points to the final race of the championship.

On the last race of the season the 6 Hours of Bahrain on 29–30 November, González, Baguette and Plowman qualified in sixth place and finished in fourth position (sixth overall). Therefore, Plowman won the 2013 FIA WEC World Championship for drivers and teams in LMP2 class.

British GT
Plowman first raced in British GT in 2015.  In 2017, he joined the series full-time, partnering Kelvin Fletcher in a Nissan GT4, who has remained his co-driver ever since. Plowman and Fletcher won the GT4 Pro-Am title in 2019, before sitting out the 2020 season due to the coronavirus pandemic. 

In 2021, the pair returned with JRM but then switched to Paddock Motorsport, a team founded by Plowman and Fletcher, already competing in the BRSCC's Mazda MX5 Championship and the GT Cup Championship. With Plowman being both driver and team principal, the team expanded in 2022 to run cars in both GT3 and GT4. 

In the Oulton Park round of the 2022 season, Plowman and Fletcher took their first overall win in British GT; the Paddock Motorsport team would also manage their first GT4 win in the season finale at Donington Park as Moh Ritson and Kavi Jundu won the GT4 Pro-Am class.

Racing record

Complete Formula 3 Euro Series results
(key)

American open–wheel racing results
(key) (Races in bold indicate pole position) (Races in italics indicate fastest lap)

Indy Lights results

IndyCar Series

 1 The Las Vegas Indy 300 was abandoned after Dan Wheldon died from injuries sustained in a 15-car crash on lap 11.

Indianapolis 500

Complete American Le Mans Series results
(key) (Races in bold indicate pole position) (Races in italics indicate fastest lap)

Complete FIA World Endurance Championship results
(key) (Races in bold indicate pole position) (Races in italics indicate fastest lap)

24 Hours of Le Mans results

Complete British GT Championship results
(key) (Races in bold indicate pole position) (Races in italics indicate fastest lap)

Complete Blancpain GT Series Sprint Cup results

References

External links
Official Martin Plowman fan club
Martin Plowman interview at BritsOnPole.com

1987 births
Living people
People from Tamworth (district)
English racing drivers
Formula 3 Euro Series drivers
Italian Formula Renault 2.0 drivers
Formula Renault Eurocup drivers
Indy Lights drivers
IndyCar Series drivers
Karting World Championship drivers
FIA World Endurance Championship drivers
24 Hours of Le Mans drivers
WeatherTech SportsCar Championship drivers
24 Hours of Daytona drivers
Blancpain Endurance Series drivers
Indianapolis 500 drivers
British GT Championship drivers
Sportspeople from Tamworth, Staffordshire
Prema Powerteam drivers
Arrow McLaren SP drivers
Panther Racing drivers
RC Motorsport drivers
AFS Racing drivers
Andretti Autosport drivers
A. J. Foyt Enterprises drivers
Conquest Racing drivers
OAK Racing drivers